Organ is a British independent magazine covering music, art and underculture. Based in London, the magazine was founded in 1986 as a handmade fanzine and has evolved many times over the years.  It has covered a variety of rock, alternative, punk, progressive, metal and experimental music as well as a wide range of contemporary art and visual artists.

The Organ is run by Sean Worrall and Organart, a music group which includes a radio and TV show, a mail-order music distribution system, artwork, animation and video making, gig promotion (there have been over 1000 Organ shows in London, many big names have made their first London moves via Organ gigs) and ORG records. 

ORG is an alternative record label which has released material by bands including Cardiacs, Dream City Film Club, Cay, Sleepy People, The Brian Jonestown Massacre, King Prawn, My Vitriol, Pop-A Cat-a-Petal (later Ultrasound), The Monsoon Bassoon, Breed 77, Pure Reason Revolution, Cynical Smile, Inaura, Rhatigan, Cheesecake Truck, Everything Must Go, Sonic Boom Boys and many others.

Some of the bands who have made their very first or very early moves via the ORGAN RADIO series of compilation albums include 65daysofstatic, Sikth, I-DEF-I, PULKAS, King Prawn, Lostprophets, earthtone9, Cortizone, Miocene, CHARGER, Skindred, One Minute Silence, Aerobitch, Raging Speedhorn.

The Organ magazine has existed as a fanzine, a glossy print magazine, a folded A3 paper newsheet and a website, a cassette magazine, indeed one issue of Organ was printed on a t-shirt. 

Currently, Organ is a weekly on-line magazine, released alongside daily updated alternative music and art news pages on organart's website. There is also a weekly radio programme on the London community radio station Resonance FM presented by the Organ team on Sunday nights at 9.00 PM.

Organ is noted for its fanzine nature and alternative DIY ethic; this includes a diversity of  coverage, an energetic and subjective stream of consciousness writing style, and some independence and its role in publicising new talent. The magazine has been known to find new or neglected acts long before the mainstream music press or industry.

References

External links
 Organ web site 

Fanzines
Independent magazines
Magazines established in 1986
Magazines published in London
Music magazines published in the United Kingdom
Weekly magazines published in the United Kingdom